Mark Newell (born 19 December 1973) is a former English cricketer and current first class umpire. He was a right-handed batsman and occasional right-arm bowler who played for Sussex County Cricket Club and Derbyshire County Cricket Club between 1995 and 1999. He joined the ECB panel of first class umpires in 2017.

Signing professional terms for his home county Sussex in 1994 Newell joined his elder brother Keith on the Sussex playing staff for the 1995 season having enjoyed a successful year at Lord’s on the young cricketers staff.

Newell made his first class and List A debuts the following season, ignominiously bagging a pair in his first championship game at Worcester but fairing better in a Sunday League game against Derbyshire, scoring 48 in a successful run chase. It was in the short format that Newell proved most successful for Sussex averaging 35 over the course of the next two seasons for the county. The championship provided some success but no consistency of note. Three championship centuries were scored but after a career high 135 not out against Derbyshire he was dismayed to be dropped for the following match. Eventually returning to the first team, following a good innings against the touring South Africans, Newell scored one more century against Somerset before a drastic loss of form led to a justified dropping and no further appearances for the county. At the end of the season Newell declined the offer of a one year deal to seek pastures new.

A short term deal was offered by Derbyshire for the 1999 season but Newell could not produce any form for the Peakites and was subsequently released at the end of the season and played no further cricket at first class level.

Following playing retirement in 2010 after a long club cricket association with Three Bridges CC in the Sussex League he joined the panel of league umpires for 2011. Steady progression through the divisions and in national club competitions led to county 2nd team appointments, culminating in his addition to the reserve list of the first class panel in 2017. He umpired his initial first class fixture that year at Canterbury as Kent played Leeds/Bradford MCCU in a pre season friendly. 2019 saw debut appearances in all three first class competitions as his level of performance at 2nd team and Kia Super League level were well rewarded.

External links
Mark Newell at CricketArchive 
 https://www.espncricinfo.com/player/mark-newell-18006

1973 births
English cricketers
Sussex cricketers
Derbyshire cricketers
Living people
Sussex Cricket Board cricketers
Buckinghamshire cricketers
English cricket umpires